Agustín Alberto Balbuena (1 September 1945 – 9 March 2021) was an Argentine football striker who won with Club Atlético Independiente four Copa Libertadores and one Copa Intercontinental.

Career
Balbuena began his professional playing career in 1964 with home town club Colón de Santa Fe, after a spell with Racing Club. He played for Rosario Central where he was a losing finalist in the 1970 Nacional.

In 1971 Balbuena joined Club Atlético Independiente where he became an important player during the most successful period in the history of the club. He appeared with the team that won the 1971 Metropolitano to qualify for the Copa Libertadores. Independiente won Copa Libertadores on four consecutive occasions: 1972, 1973, 1974 and 1975. He scored the winning goal in the Copa Intercontinental in 1973 against Juventus.

Balbuena was included in the Argentina national team for the 1974 FIFA World Cup, one of eight national team occasions.

Later in his career he played for Bucaramanga of Colombia and CD FAS of El Salvador.

Death
Balbuena died aged 75 on 9 March 2021.

Honours
Independiente
 Primera División Argentina: 1971 Metropolitano
 Copa Libertadores: 1972, 1973, 1974, 1975
 Copa Intercontinental: 1973
 Copa Interamericana: 1972, 1973, 1974

References

External links
 

1945 births
2021 deaths
Footballers from Santa Fe, Argentina
Argentine footballers
Argentina international footballers
1974 FIFA World Cup players
Association football forwards
Club Atlético Colón footballers
Racing Club de Avellaneda footballers
Rosario Central footballers
Club Atlético Independiente footballers
Atlético Bucaramanga footballers
C.D. FAS footballers
Argentine Primera División players
Primera Nacional players
Categoría Primera A players
Argentine expatriate footballers
Argentine expatriate sportspeople in Colombia
Expatriate footballers in Colombia
Argentine expatriate sportspeople in El Salvador
Expatriate footballers in El Salvador